"That's My Story" is a song written by Lee Roy Parnell and Tony Haselden, and recorded by American country music artist Collin Raye.  It was released in December 1993 as the first single from his album Extremes. 

The song features the repeating refrain "that's my story, and I'm sticking to it," which also later became the catchphrase of comedian Colin Quinn.

Content
When confronted by his significant other about where he had been the previous night after stumbling in one morning, the singer claims he had spent the night outside in his hammock, asserting "that's my story, and I'm sticking to it." She catches him in the lie, noting that she had placed the hammock in the attic a week ago; he initially, and unconvincingly, tries to stick to the lie, but eventually breaks down and admits he has been playing cards with his friends, and that to avoid a repeat of the situation, she should buy a mobile phone.

Music video
The music video was directed by Jon Small, and premiered in late 1993.

Chart performance
The song debuted at number 52 on the Hot Country Songs chart dated December 18, 1993. It charted for 20 weeks on that chart and peaked at number 6 on the chart dated March 19, 1994.

Charts

Year-end charts

References

1993 singles
1993 songs
Collin Raye songs
Song recordings produced by Paul Worley
Epic Records singles
Songs written by Lee Roy Parnell
Songs written by Tony Haselden